Order of precedence of Belgian national orders and awards.
Grey text indicates dormant awards.

The list is established based on the official current order of precedence as stated in military regulations, combined with the list established in 1985 by Charles Borné.
As an official order of precedence including all medals ever created by Belgium was never established, currently obsolete commemorative medals are excluded from this list.

See also

 List of Orders, Decorations and Medals of the Kingdom of Belgium

References

 Belgian military regulation DGHR-SPS-DECOR-001 of 18 January 2006
 André Charles Borné: Distinctions Honorifiques De La Belgique 1830-1985 (ISBN 2802200577)

 
Belgium